
Gmina Bolesław is a rural gmina (administrative district) in Olkusz County, Lesser Poland Voivodeship, in southern Poland.

Villages
Gmina Bolesław contains the villages and settlements of Bolesław, Hutki, Krążek, Krze, Krzykawa, Krzykawka, Laski, Małobądz, Międzygórze, Nowy Ujków and Ujków Nowy Kolonia.

Neighbouring gminas
Gmina Bolesław is bordered by the towns of Bukowno, Dąbrowa Górnicza and Sławków, and by the gminas of Klucze and Olkusz.

References
Polish official population figures 2006

Boleslaw
Olkusz County